Alison Phipps is a British political sociologist, gender studies scholar and feminist theorist, who is a professor of sociology at Newcastle University's School of Geography, Politics and Sociology.

Career
Phipps was formerly director and professor of gender studies at the University of Sussex. She was Chair of the Feminist and Women's Studies Association of the UK and Ireland from 2009 to 2012 and was one of the co-founders of Universities Against Gender-Based Violence. She is a Senior Fellow of the Higher Education Academy.

Research and interests
Phipps' research concerns feminist theory, sexual violence, reproduction, and institutional cultures. According to Google Scholar her work has been cited over 2,000 times. Her latest book Me, Not You is a critique of mainstream feminist activism against sexual violence, especially its reliance on criminal punishment, and puts forward the concept of 'political whiteness' in its analysis of how the movement operates. The book has been endorsed by Mariame Kaba and Mona Eltahawy.

Phipps co-authored the 2013 National Union of Students report on 'lad culture' in UK universities and was subsequently a member of the NUS strategy group on this issue alongside Laura Bates and others. With her project Changing University Cultures, she has led interventions at Imperial College London and Sussex University, amongst other institutions, designed to tackle inequalities and issues such as bullying, harassment and violence. She worked closely with Universities UK on the issue of cultural change at universities to tackle sexual harassment and violence, before withdrawing from this relationship during the 2018 pensions strikes in protest at Universities UK's involvement in and actions on this issue.

Phipps has researched and has been active in debating the anti-gender movement and far-right attacks on LGBT rights. She is also a well-known opponent of carceral feminism and trans-exclusionary feminism, and is a supporter of sex workers' rights. As Director of Gender Studies at Sussex University, she entered a collaborative partnership with the Sex Worker Advocacy and Resistance Movement (SWARM, then named the Sex Worker Open University) and supported a campaign led by the English Collective of Prostitutes to decriminalise the sex industry.

Recognition and media
Phipps won the 2015 FWSA Book Prize from the Feminist Studies Association for the book The Politics of the Body. Alongside her academic writing, she has been published in the Guardian, Open Democracy, the New Statesman, and Times Higher Education. She has been interviewed on Radio 4's Thinking Allowed and Woman's Hour.

Books
Women in Science, Engineering and Technology: Three Decades of UK Initiatives (Trentham Books, 2008)
The Politics of the Body: Gender in a Neoliberal and Neoconservative Age (Polity Press, 2014)
Me, Not You: The Trouble with Mainstream Feminism (Manchester University Press, 2020)

References

External links 

 Personal website
 Alison Phipps' Newcastle University profile
 

British sociologists
Academics of Newcastle University
Academics of the University of Sussex
Living people
Gender studies academics
Feminist theorists
Year of birth missing (living people)
British women sociologists